Cascade, Smallsat and Ionospheric Polar Explorer (CASSIOPE), is a Canadian Space Agency (CSA) multi-mission satellite operated by the University of Calgary. The mission development and operations from launch to February 2018 was funded through CSA and the Technology Partnerships Canada program. In February, 2018 CASSIOPE became part of the European Space Agency's Swarm constellation through the Third Party Mission Program, known as Swarm Echo, or Swarm-E. It was launched September 29, 2013, on the first flight of the SpaceX Falcon 9 v1.1 launch vehicle.  CASSIOPE is the first Canadian hybrid satellite to carry a dual mission in the fields of telecommunications and scientific research. The main objectives are to gather information to better understand the science of space weather, while verifying high-speed communications concepts through the use of advanced space technologies.

The satellite was deployed in an elliptical polar orbit and carries a commercial communications system called Cascade as well as a scientific experiment package called e-POP (enhanced Polar Outflow Probe).

Following staging, the Falcon 9's first stage was used by SpaceX for a controlled descent and landing test. While the first stage was destroyed on impact with the ocean, significant data was acquired and the test was considered a success.

Spacecraft
It combines the function of two distinct missions in order to be more cost-effective and reduce risk.

The spacecraft carries a primary payload of two instrument suites: the Cascade commercial communications system and a scientific payload named e-POP.

Cascade
The commercial payload, named Cascade, is a technology demonstrator courier in the sky, aimed a providing a proof of concept for a digital broadband courier service for commercial use.  Built by MDA, the operational concept is to receive very large data files as the satellite orbits the globe, store them onboard temporarily, then deliver them at a later time to nearly any destination worldwide.

The demonstrator will provide a secure digital store-and-forward file delivery service, exploiting the fact that CASSIOPE passes over much of the globe 15 times per day.  It has been described as a courier service, with the customers using a small parabolic antenna of one or two meters (three or six feet) to upload or download files at a rate of 1.2 gigabits per second. The storage capacity will be between 50 and 500 gigabytes and the data delivery time will be about 90 minutes, depending on the pickup and deposit points on the globe.

e-POP
The e-POP portion of CASSIOPE is a suite of eight scientific instruments. The University of Calgary's Institute for Space Research leads the science project, while MDA is the prime contractor for the mission including launch and operation of the spacecraft. The orbital science mission is scheduled for a 21-month duration.

e-POP will gather data on Solar storms in the upper atmosphere.  These storms give rise to the polar aurora or northern lights seen in the skies in northern latitudes.  While these atmospheric glows may offer a thrilling night time spectacle, the inducing radiation can interfere with radio communications, GPS navigation, and other space-based systems. The eight scientific instruments aboard CASSIOPE will help scientists understand solar weather and eventually plan for measures to mitigate its deleterious effects.

The e-POP payload contains eight scientific instruments:
Coherent EM Radio Tomography (CER), measuring radio propagation and ionospheric scintillation
Fast Auroral Imager (FAI), measuring large-scale auroral emissions
GPS Altitude and Profiling Experiment (GAP), high-precision position and attitude determination
Imaging and Rapid Scanning Ion Mass Spectrometer (IRM), measuring the three-dimensional distribution of ions
Fluxgate Magnetometer (MGF), high-precision magnetic field perturbation measurement
Neutral Mass Spectrometer (NMS), measuring the mass, composition and velocity of neutral particles
Radio Receiver Instrument (RRI), measuring radio wave propagation
Suprathermal Electron Imager (SEI), measuring low-energy electron distribution

Operations
After a successful launch on September 29, 2013, CASSIOPE entered into a commissioning phase that lasted to January 1, 2014, with no faults detected on the spacecraft bus or payloads. Three ground stations were utilized, including Kiruna (Sweden), Inuvik (Canada), and the German Antarctic Receiving Station at the General Bernardo O'Higgins Base in Antarctica. Routine operations were scheduled to run to March, 2015. The mission was extended via funding from the Technology Partnerships Canada program through the Industrial Technologies Office that was part of the Canadian government at the time. In February 2018, the European Space Agency, through the Third Party Mission Program, integrated the mission into the Swarm constellation of satellites, dubbing CASSIOPE "Swarm-Echo", recognizing the synergy between the two missions in collecting space weather data in low Earth orbit. The partnership allowed for four ground station contacts per day, rather than one, greatly increasing the amount of data that could be downloaded from the e-POP suite of instruments.

On August 11, 2016, one of the four reaction wheels used for spacecraft attitude control failed. This did not affect spacecraft operations in a significant way since only three wheels are required for 3-axis stabilized pointing. A second reaction wheel failed on February 27, 2021, forcing the spacecraft into a slowly spinning, safe-hold attitude configuration. Three-axis stabilized control was restored in September 2021 by implementing a bias momentum configuration on the two remaining wheels (spinning the wheels in opposite directions), and using the magnetic torque rods for attitude control. Three months later, on December 17, 2021, a third reaction wheel failed, leaving the spacecraft with no viable methods for fixed attitude pointing. Although most of the e-POP instruments were fully operational, without stabilized pointing much of the science objectives could not be met, resulting in a conclusion of the operational portion of the mission on December 31, 2021.

History

The satellite that became CASSIOPE began with a 1996 concept for a small, inexpensive microsatellite called Polar Outflow Probe, or POP.  The Canadian Space Agency funded a 1997 feasibility study that led to a modified mission concept that was designed during 2000-2005.
The revised concept was to combine an enhanced version of POP, called e-POP, with an MDA Corporation commercial satellite called Cascade, into a single satellite, and to design and build a generic, low-cost small satellite bus that would be useful for other Canadian satellite missions in the future.

The eight e-POP scientific instruments were built, calibrated, and tested in 2005-2007, with integration onto the satellite bus for spacecraft-level testing in 2008-2009.

Launch

The satellite was launched on September 29, 2013, aboard a SpaceX Falcon 9 v1.1 rocket.

At the time the launch was contracted in 2005, a SpaceX Falcon 1 was the planned launch vehicle. The launch was originally scheduled for 2008 from Omelek Island. The launch date slipped several times, and after SpaceX discontinued the Falcon 1, the launch was shifted to the much larger Falcon 9 in June 2010.

MDA contracted with SpaceX to put the CASSIOPE payload on the first flight of an essentially new launch vehicle—a non-operational demonstration launch. The Falcon 9 v1.1, upgraded from the original Falcon 9, is a 60 percent heavier rocket with 60% more thrust. The flight was contracted with a payload mass that is very small relative to the rocket's capability, at a discounted rate because it was a technology demonstration mission for SpaceX, approximately 20% of the normal published price for SpaceX Falcon 9 LEO missions.

Since this was the first flight of a new launch vehicle, the US Air Force had estimated the overall probability of failure on the mission was nearly fifty percent. In the event, the mission was successful, as was each of the next 13 Falcon 9 v1.1 missions before a launch vehicle failure and loss of mission occurred on Falcon 9 Flight 19 in June 2015.

Post-mission launch vehicle testing

After the second stage separated from the booster stage, SpaceX conducted a novel flight test where the booster conducted a test to attempt to reenter the lower atmosphere in a controlled manner and decelerate to a simulated over-water landing.  The test was successful, but the booster stage was not recovered.

After the three-minute boost phase of September 29, 2013 launch, the booster stage attitude was reversed, and three of the nine engines refired at high altitude, as planned, to initiate the deceleration and controlled descent trajectory to the surface of the ocean. The first phase of the test worked well and the first stage re-entered safely.

However, the first stage began to roll due to aerodynamic forces during the descent through the atmosphere, and the roll rate exceeded the capabilities of the booster attitude control system (ACS) to null it out. The fuel in the tanks centrifuged to the outside of the tank and the single engine involved in the low-altitude deceleration maneuver shut down.  Debris from the first stage was subsequently retrieved from the ocean.

SpaceX also ran a post-mission test on the second stage.  While a number of the new capabilities were successfully tested on the September 29, 2013, CASSIOPE flight, there was an issue with the second stage restart test. The test to reignite the second stage Merlin 1D vacuum engine once the rocket had deployed its primary payload (CASSIOPE) and all of its nanosat secondary payloads was unsuccessful.
The engine failed to restart while the second stage was coasting in low Earth orbit.

Secondary payloads
Five nanosatellite spacecraft that were also carried to orbit on the same launch vehicle that carried the CASSIOPE primary payload:
CUSat, Cornell University
Drag and Atmospheric Neutral Density Explorer (DANDE), University of Colorado Boulder
three Polar Orbiting Passive Atmospheric Calibration Spheres (POPACS), each a  white aluminum sphere, joint project of Morehead State University, University of Arkansas, Montana State University, Drexel University, and Planetary Systems Corporation.

See also

 List of Falcon 9 and Falcon Heavy launches

References

Further reading

External links 
CASSIOPE at the Canadian Space Agency
CASSIOPE at MacDonald, Dettwiler and Associates

Space program of Canada
SpaceX commercial payloads
Spacecraft launched in 2013
Satellites of Canada
Articles containing video clips
2013 in Canada
Geospace monitoring satellites